Chaqabol (also Romanized as Chaqābol, Chagawal, Chaghābal, Chaqābal, Chaqāvol, Chaqāwal, Choghābal, Choghaval, Choqābal, and Choqā Bol) is a village in Bardesareh Rural District, Oshtorinan District, Borujerd County, Lorestan Province, Iran. At the 2006 census, its population was 24, in 6 families.

References 

Towns and villages in Borujerd County